Golański (feminine: Golańska; plural: Golańscy) is a surname. Notable people with the name include:

 Artur Golański (born 1992), Polish footballer
 Henryk Golański (1908–1995), Polish diplomat and politician
 Paweł Golański (born 1982), Polish footballer

See also
 

Polish-language surnames